Glyphodes lachesis is a moth in the family Crambidae. It was described by Arthur Gardiner Butler in 1882. It is found in Papua New Guinea.

References

Moths described in 1882
Glyphodes